Robert McKenzie (17 February 1904 – 19 July 1993) was a New Zealand cricketer. He played in one first-class match for Wellington in 1929/30.

See also
 List of Wellington representative cricketers

References

External links
 

1904 births
1993 deaths
New Zealand cricketers
Wellington cricketers
Cricketers from Wellington City